Alfonso Carrillo de Albornoz (died 1434) was a Roman Catholic cardinal.

References

1434 deaths
15th-century Castilian cardinals